Catholic television refers to television networks and programs based on the teachings of the Catholic Church.

Networks

Argentina
 Canal Orbe 21, HQ; Buenos Aires

Brazil
 Canção Nova, HQ; Cachoeira Paulista
 Rede Aparecida, HQ; Aparecida, SP. Launched in 2005
 Rede Vida, HQ; São José do Rio Preto, SP. Launched in 1995

Canada
 Salt + Light Television, HQ; Toronto

Chile
 TV+ (Chile), HQ; Santiago

Colombia
Cristovisión, HQ; Bogotá

Congo, Democratic Republic of
Zénith Radio-Télévision, HQ; Lubumbashi

Croatia
 Laudato TV (Laudato Televizija), HQ; Zagreb

France
 KTO (TV channel), HQ; Malakoff, near Paris. Broadcasts in France, Belgium, and Switzerland

Germany
 EWTN Deutschland - Katholisches TV, HQ; Kőln
 K-TV Katholisches Fernsehen, HQ; Wangen im Allgäu. A religious broadcasting network in Germany

India
 Divyavani TV, HQ; Hyderabad, Telangana
 Goodness (TV channel), HQ; Kochi, Kerala
Jeevan TV, HQ; Kochi, Kerala
 Madha TV, HQ; Chennai, Tamil Nadu
 Shalom (TV channel), HQ; Thiruvananthapuram, Kerala
 Shekinah TV, HQ; Thalikode, Kerala

Italy/Vatican
 Padre Pio TV, HQ; San Giovanni Rotondo
 Telepace, HQ; Cerna
 TV2000, HQ; Roma
 Vatican Media, HQ; Roma

Lebanon
 Télé Lumière, HQ; Beirut

Mexico
María Visión, HQ; Zapopan

Netherlands
 KRO-NCRV, HQ; Hilversum

Nigeria
 Catholic Television of Nigeria, HQ; Abuja
 Lumen Christi TV, HQ; Lagos. See television network in Nigeria

Pakistan
 Catholic TV (Pakistan), former Pakistani television channel

Panama
 FETV (Panama), HQ; Panama City

Peru
 JN19 TV, HQ; San Miguel District, Lima

Philippines
 Cebu Catholic Television Network, HQ; Cebu
 TV Maria, HQ; Manila

Poland
 Telewizja Trwam, HQ; Toruń

Portugal
 Angelus TV, HQ; Fátima

Puerto Rico
 WORO-DT Canal 13 (Teleoro), HQ; San Juan

South Korea
 Catholic Peace Broadcasting Corporation (CPBC), HQ; Seoul. See Andrew Yeom Soo-jung

Spain
 Cadena COPE Television, HQ; Madrid
 Trece (Spanish TV channel), HQ; Madrid

Sri Lanka
 Verbum TV, HQ; Ragama

United States
 Catholic Faith Network, HQ; Uniondale, New York
 CatholicTV, HQ; Watertown, Massachusetts
 Eternal Word Television Network, HQ; Irondale, Alabama. The world's largest religious media network.
 KIFR, US, HQ; Fresno, California
 New Evangelization Television, HQ; Brooklyn, New York
 Shalom World, HQ; Edinburg, Texas

Venezuela
 Niños Cantores Televisión, HQ; Zulia
 Vale TV, HQ; Caracas

See also
 International religious television broadcasters
 SIGNIS (World Catholic Association for Communication)

References

Catholic Church-related lists
Catholic television